Events from the year 1997 in Taiwan, Republic of China. This year is numbered Minguo 86 according to the official Republic of China calendar.

Incumbents
 President – Lee Teng-hui
 Vice President – Lien Chan
 Premier – Lien Chan, Vincent Siew
 Vice Premier – Hsu Li-teh, John Chiang, Liu Chao-shiuan

Events

March
 28 March
 The opening of Miniatures Museum of Taiwan in Zhongshan District, Taipei.
 The opening of Tamsui Line and Xinbeitou Branch Line of Taipei Metro.

April
 20 April – Murder of Pai Hsiao-yen in Taipei County.

June
 11 June
 The establishment of FTV News.
 The first broadcast of Formosa Television.

October
 19 October – The opening of Xinzhuang Baseball Stadium in Xinzhuang City, Taipei County.

December
 13 December – The opening of Memorial Hall of Founding of Yilan Administration in Yilan City, Yilan County.

Births
 26 June – Kent Tsai, actor
 19 December – Chen Su-yu, badminton player

References

 
Years of the 20th century in Taiwan